The Lambton Generating Station was a coal-fuelled power plant located on the St. Clair River near Corunna, Ontario, delivering up to 950 MW of power to the grid. It is owned by Ontario Power Generation.

The plant previously had a total generating capacity of 1,976 MW, prior to the permanent shutdown of generating units 1 and 2 (of four) in October 2010. The remaining units were shut down in September 2013. It was connected to the power grid via numerous 230 kV lines, and also had two interconnections with Detroit Edison and ITC Transmission via a 230 kV line (Lambton-St. Clair #1) and a 345 kV line (Lambton-St. Clair #2). It is located almost exactly across the St. Clair River from Detroit Edison's St. Clair Power Plant in East China, Michigan.

The facility had three  smokestacks, one of which was equipped with flue-gas desulfurization units, commonly called "scrubbers", to remove sulfur oxide.  Emissions from scrubbers at the Lambton station could be seen for over 16 km, although with the scrubbers operating properly, these plumes likely had over 90% less SO2 compared with other coal-fired stations without scrubbers.

On November 22, 2016, it was announced that Ontario Power Generation was no longer looking at alternative uses for Lambton Generating Station, and that the facility would be decommissioned in 2017.
It was definitively closed in 2020. Demolition work is in progress and should last 2 years.

On February 12, 2022, the majority of buildings at Lambton Generating Station, including the three large stacks, were imploded.

Emissions 

*Calculated figures for CO2e are rounded to the nearest tonne.

Redevelopment 
In 2012, plans were announced to relocate a proposed natural gas-powered generating station, originally intended for construction by Greenfield South Power Corporation in Mississauga, near to Etobicoke's Sherway Gardens, to the Lambton Generating Station site.

Construction in Mississauga had already begun in 2011; the original site selection was cancelled during the October 2011 provincial election with the project becoming a key issue during that campaign and the subsequent 2014 campaign.

See also 

 List of electrical generating stations in Ontario
 List of electrical generating stations in Canada
 Science and technology in Canada
 List of tallest smokestacks in Canada

References 

Ontario electricity policy
Ontario Hydro
Ontario Power Generation
Coal-fired power stations in Ontario
Buildings and structures in Lambton County
Former coal-fired power stations in Canada